Sporting Clube da Praia Cruz is a football club that plays in the São Tomé and Príncipe Championship. The team is based in the island of São Tomé. The team has won eight national and six island titles and is the third team in history to claim its first title in 1982. The team currently plays in the island premier division. Its logo has a shield and is colored green and features a lion with a soccer ball on the left, the abbreviated name is bubbled on the top and the unabbreviated form is at the bottom.  Sporting Portugal are the fathering club of Sporting Praia Cruz and its 82nd affiliate. Other Sporting affiliates are Sporting Príncipe and São Tomé.

Sporting Praia Cruz is one of the most successful football (soccer) club in both São Tomé Island and São Tomé and Príncipe, having won about  32 official titles, 20 are national and the remaining 12 are regional titles. In national championship titles, they have eight, about a quarter of the championship title totals, by district, half of the titles won. Of the regional titles, about 30% of the totals, by district, nearly half of the totals. In cup titles it totals about 18% of the national titles and in super cup titles, about 40% of the total.

History
Sporting Won their first insular and national titles along with their first cup in 1982, their second were an island and then a national title won in 1984, their third were an island and national title along with a cup title in 1994, the club lost their fourth cup title in 1989, Sporting won their fourth nine years later in 1998, the fifth cup title in 2000 and won their sixth insular title in 2012 after finishing with 48 points, the club challenged the winner of the neighboring island of Príncipe, Sporting and started the first Santomean Sporting derby, the club lost the national championships. Their seventh was won in 2013 after finishing with 46 points, two less than last season, the club would later win the nation's sixth in 2013 and the following year participated in the 2014 CAF Champions League against Stade Malien of Mali in the preliminaries, they have won their first match and never scored in the second match and lost.  They have scored only a total of three goals.  Sporting Praia Cruz became champions on October 26 and later won the 2015 title for São Tomé Island later they won their seventh national championship title. In the cup competitions they won their only regional title and then their sixth and recent national title on 30 November after defeating Porto Real 6–2 in the island capital. Praia Cruz remains one of the clubs that won the most national cup titles. Sporting Praia Cruz qualified to the 2016 CAF Champions League, due to financial concerns, the club withdrew and did not challenge Nigeria's Warri Wolves in the preliminaries.  Praia Cruz also played in the 2015 Super Cup held in May 2016, they challenged the national cup runner up Porto Real and won a Super cup title.  Praia Cruz won a second straight island title totalling 9 in 2016, in mid-December, they challenged against the winner of Príncipe which would be the second Santomean Sporting derby featuring Sporting Príncipe, this time, Praia Cruz would be winners, the club won the first match 1–2 on December 14 and the second match was a two-goal draw on the 20th and with a total of four goals won their second straight national title totaling eight and also claims the most titles won in the country.  Praia Cruz chose not to appear at the CAF Champions League for 2017 due to financial problems and as a least prominent club at the continental level.  Praia Cruz headed on to the 2016 Super Cup held in April 2017, they defeated the cup winner UDRA and claimed their second straight Super Cup title. Sporting Praia Cruz made another attempt for another regional title, in the middle part of the season, it failed and club would finish as runner-up behind UDRA. At the 2017 regional cup final, the club also lost to UDRA 2–0.

Stadium
Estádio Nacional 12 de Julho is a multi-use stadium in São Tomé, São Tomé and Príncipe.  It is currently used mostly for football matches.  The stadium holds 6,500.  Its address is Avenidas das Nações Unidas.  The stadium is home to the three best football clubs in the nation and the island including Praia Cruz, Aliança Nacional. Andorinha and Vitória Riboque

The club also trains and practices at the stadium.

Logo
The logo was identical to Sporting Clube de Portugal old logo (also known as Sporting Portugal), the logo is different to other Sporting's logos, examples included Praia, Cape Verde, Bissau, Guinea-Bissau and Luanda, Angola, its logo is that of the town's crest.

Uniform
Its shirt are supplied by Adidas. Its uniform colors are green for home, yellow as a second color and blue as its third.  The home uniform has two yellow stripes on the top sleeve and a large one on the rims, The shorts rim and the sock top also has two yellow lines.  It is oppositely green for its second color.  The third color has a longer sky blue stripes, two of them on top and without rims, the shorts and sock's stripes are the same as the other two.

Its former uniform was a green (coloured like tourmaline)-white T-shirt with green socks striped at the top and a black shorts for home games and a pastel green short, green shirt and green socks which were colored black for away games.  Its later uniform would be a yellow shirt with green sleeve and collar edges, green shorts and socks for home games, a white T-shirt with black shorts and green socks for away games and a half white half black T-shirt with white shorts and green socks for alternate uniform when another team has a uniform colored white.  The uniform is now different than Sporting Lisbon and its colors relates to its own logo. Until 2014, its uniform were identical to its fathering club, Sporting Clube de Portugal.  Between 2014 and 2015, its home uniform is yellow with green stripes on the shirt top edges and a green short and socks and its away/alternate uniform features a striped green-white shirt with green sleeves and green socks.

Honours
National:
São Tomé and Príncipe Championships: 8
1982, 1985, 1994, 1999, 2007, 2013, 2015, 2016
Taça Nacional de São Tomé e Principe: 6
1982, 1993, 1994, 1998, 2000, 2015
São Tomé and Príncipe Super Cup: 5
1999, 2000, 2013, 2015, 2016
Regional:
São Tomé Island League: 9
1982, 1985, 1994, 1999, 2007, 2012, 2013, 2015, 2016
Taça Regional de São Tomé: 3
1982, 1994, 2015
Other:
São Tomé and Príncipe Solidarity Cup: 1
1999

League and cup history

Performance in African competitions

Island championships

Statistics
Best position: Preliminary Round (continental)
Best position at cup competitions: 1st (national)
Best position at an opening tournament: 1st
Appearances at a Super cup competition: 6
Appearances:
National: 9
Regional: 32
Highest number of points in a season: 53, in 2016

Current squad

See also
Sporting Clube do Príncipe, another Sporting Club in the nation located in the island of Príncipe
Sporting Clube de São Tomé, another Sporting Club also based on the island, once an all-island club, the club serves the city and the district

References

External links
Team profile – ogol.com

 
Football clubs in São Tomé and Príncipe
Água Grande District
São Tomé Island Premier Division